William Woolls (30 March 1814 – 14 March 1893) was an Australian botanist, clergyman and schoolmaster.

Woolls, the nineteenth child of merchant Edward Woolls, was born at Winchester, England and educated at the grammar school, Bishop's Waltham, and at 16 years of age endeavoured unsuccessfully to obtain a cadetship in the British East India Company's service. A year later he emigrated to Australia, landing in Sydney on 16 April 1832, and was soon appointed an assistant-master at The King's School, Parramatta, having met William Grant Broughton—then Church of England Archdeacon of New South Wales—on the way out. About four years later he went to Sydney and maintained himself by journalism and giving private tuition. He was then for a period classical master at Sydney College, but resigned this to open a private school at Parramatta which he conducted for many years. He married Dinah Catherine Hall in 1838 and she bore a son and a daughter before dying in childbirth in 1844.  In 1845, he married Ann Boag.

He published two boyish productions in verse, The Voyage: A Moral Poem, in 1832, and Australia: A Moral and Descriptive Poem in 1833. In 1838 he brought out Miscellanies in Prose and Verse, mainly prose essays. He also published in 1841 A Short Account of the Character and Labours of the Rev. Samuel Marsden. His friendship with the Rev. James Walker, headmaster of The King's School between 1843 and 1848, led to Woolls becoming interested in botany, and he subsequently did much work on the flora of Australia. A paper on "Introduced Plants" sent to the Linnean Society at London led to his being elected a fellow of the society and other work of his brought the degree of PhD from the University of Göttingen, Germany. In 1862 he married his third wife, Sarah Elizabeth Lowe.  He gave up his school in 1865 and in 1867 published A Contribution to the Flora of Australia, a collection of his botanical papers.

In 1873 Woolls took holy orders in the Church of England, became incumbent of Richmond, and later rural dean. Another collection of his papers, Lectures on the Vegetable Kingdom with special reference to the Flora of Australia, appeared in 1879.  According to K. J. Cable, "... Woolls was best known for his promotion of Australian botany and his assistance to other scholars rather than for large-scale systematic work."

Woolls retired from the ministry in 1883 and lived at Sydney for the rest of his life. He was much in touch with Ferdinand von Mueller and assisted him in his botanical work. Woolls's next volume, Plants of New South Wales, was published in 1885, and his Plants Indigenous and Naturalized in the Neighbourhood of Sydney, a revised and enlarged edition of a paper prepared in 1880, came out in 1891.  He died of paraplegia in the Sydney suburb of Burwood survived by his third wife.

References

Further reading

1814 births
1893 deaths
19th-century Australian botanists
Australian non-fiction writers
English emigrants to colonial Australia
Botanical collectors active in Australia